The Centaur of Vulci is a statue of the Etruscan Orientalising period, discovered in Vulci near Etruscan Viterbo, now in the collection of the National Etruscan Museum of Villa Giulia in Rome.

History 
The statue was discovered in a private tomb in the necropolis of Poggio Maremma in Vulci Archaeological Park.

Description 
This nenfro statue dates from 590-580 BC. It represents a centaur, a character from Greek mythology with a human torso and a horse's body.

The head, with an incised beard and hair falling into three braids on the upper legs, gives way to a brief chest and an equine body which lacks a tail. The arms are missing and also the legs below the knees; hands are visible on the hips.

References

Etruscan mythology
6th-century BC sculptures
Italian sculpture
Etruscan sculptures
Collections of the Villa Giulia
Vulci
Etruscan artefacts
Statues in Italy